The Cornish Shrimper 19 is a British trailerable sailboat that was designed by Roger Dongray, inspired by traditional shrimp fishery boat designs and first built in 1979.

Production
The design has been built by Cornish Crabbers in Wadebridge, Cornwall in the United Kingdom since 1979. The company has built more than 1,100 examples of the design and it remains in production.

Design

The Cornish Shrimper 19 is a recreational keelboat, built predominantly of hand-laid, solid glassfibre, with wood trim and wooden spars. It has a gaff rig sloop with a wooden bowsprit, a plumb stem, an angled transom, a transom-hung rudder controlled by a tiller and a stub keel with a centreboard. It displaces .

Operational history

In a 2010 review Steve Henkel wrote, "This is a character boat with concomitant grace, and with a good measure of performance and practicality, too. What she lacks in headroom, she makes up in charm. In England, she has cult-boat status. Best features: The outboard well, placed inside the cockpit. gives easy access to engine controls and helps maintain vessel’s good looks. Extensive use of varnished wood below lends a touch of elegance. Short bilge runners allow the boat to take the ground nearly upright. Foam buoyancy for safety is built in under cockpit seats and under foredeck. Handy self-draining bow well in the foredeck gives secure stowage for ground tackle. Ramp launching is easier than comps due to shallow draft. Sturdy tabernacle is judged easier to use than a mere hinge on deck when raising and lowering mast. Worst features: New and resale prices are high, and headroom is low, compared to comps. Cockpit footwell is non-self-bailing. Substantial use of varnished wood looks great, but means more than ordinary maintenance is needed."

A 2013 review in Cruising World by Jen Brett, described the design as "a salty little boat" and noted "with a large cockpit, the Shrimper makes an excellent daysailer for a family, and the basic yet comfortable accommodations below allow the boat to be a simple coastal cruiser." Of the boat's looks, she wrote, "you’ll definitely turn heads while sailing through the harbor".

See also
List of sailing boat types

Similar sailboats
Com-Pac 19
Mariner 19
Mercury 18
Nordica 16
Sanibel 18
West Wight Potter 19

References

External links

Keelboats
1970s sailboat type designs
Trailer sailers
Sailing yachts
Sailboat types built by Cornish Crabbers
Sailboat type designs by Roger Dongray